Wisteriopsis reticulata is a species of flowering plant in the family Fabaceae, native to mainland China, Hainan, Taiwan and Vietnam. It was first described by George Bentham in 1852 as Millettia reticulata. Anne M. Schot moved it to Callerya reticulata in 1994, then as a result of a  molecular phylogenetic study in 2019, it was moved to the newly created genus Wisteriopsis. It has become naturalized in parts of Florida and Japan.

References

Wisterieae
Flora of North-Central China
Flora of South-Central China
Flora of Southeast China
Flora of Hainan
Flora of Taiwan
Flora of Vietnam
Plants described in 1852